Frank Anthony Banda (born August 10, 1993) is an American professional baseball pitcher in the Washington Nationals organization. He played college baseball for San Jacinto College. The Milwaukee Brewers selected Banda in the tenth round of the 2012 MLB draft. He made his MLB debut with the Arizona Diamondbacks in 2017 and has also played for the Tampa Bay Rays, New York Mets, Pittsburgh Pirates, Toronto Blue Jays and New York Yankees.

Amateur career
Banda attended Sinton High School in Sinton, Texas, where he played for the school's baseball team. The Arizona Diamondbacks selected Banda in the 33rd round of the 2011 Major League Baseball draft. He did not sign and attended San Jacinto College, where he pitched to a 1.95 ERA in  innings.

Professional career

Milwaukee Brewers
The Milwaukee Brewers selected Banda in the tenth round of the 2012 Major League Baseball draft out of San Jacinto College. He signed and made his professional debut that year with the AZL Brewers where he was 2–3 with a 5.83 ERA in 41.2 innings pitched. 

In 2013, he played for the Helena Brewers where he pitched to a 3–4 record and 4.45 ERA in 14 starts. Banda began 2014 with the Wisconsin Timber Rattlers.

Arizona Diamondbacks
On July 31, 2014, the Brewers traded Banda and Mitch Haniger to the Arizona Diamondbacks in exchange for Gerardo Parra. Arizona assigned him to the South Bend Silver Hawks, where he finished the season. In 26 combined games (20 starts) between Wisconsin and South Bend, he compiled a 9–6 record with a 3.03 ERA and 1.36 WHIP. 

He spent 2015 with the Visalia Rawhide where he was 8–8 with a 3.32 ERA in 28 games (27 starts), with one shutout. Banda led the league with 152 strikeouts and 3 balks, and was 2nd  in starts, 3rd with 151.2 innings, 8th with 12 wild pitches, and 10th in wins. He was an MILB.COM Organization All Star, and a post-season All Star.

Banda began 2016 with the Mobile BayBears and was promoted to the Reno Aces in June. He played in the All-Star Futures Game that July. In 26 starts between Mobile and Reno he pitched to a 10–6 record and 2.88 ERA, with 152 strikeouts in 150 innings. He was a mid-season All Star, an MILB.COM Organization All Star, and a Futures Game selection. The Diamondbacks added him to their 40-man roster after the 2016 season. Banda started the 2017 season pitching for Reno.

Banda made his major league debut on July 22, 2017, taking the loss in a game against the Washington Nationals. Banda was effective for the first two times through the division-leading Nationals' batting order, giving up his only run on a titanic solo shot by Bryce Harper that reached the Chase Field concourse but gave up three more runs and was pulled in the sixth inning. He was optioned back to Reno the next day. He was recalled twice more and finished the season with a 2–3 record and 5.96 ERA in  innings. In 22 starts (10th-most in the league) for Reno he was 8–7 with 12 wild pitches (2nd), 116 strikeouts (5th), 51 walks (7th) and a 5.39 ERA.

Tampa Bay Rays
On February 18, 2018, the Diamondbacks traded Banda to the Tampa Bay Rays in a three-team trade, in which the New York Yankees acquired Brandon Drury from Arizona, the Diamondbacks acquired Steven Souza from the Rays and Taylor Widener from the Yankees, and the Rays acquired Nick Solak from the Yankees and two players to be named later (Sam McWilliams and Colin Poche) from the Diamondbacks. Banda began the 2018 season with the Durham Bulls.  He made his Rays debut on May 15, 2018, against the Kansas City Royals. On June 4, he was diagnosed a torn ulnar collateral ligament with requiring Tommy John surgery, effectively ending his 2018 season and half of the following season.

In 2019 pitching for three minor league teams he was 2–4 with a 5.67 ERA. Pitching for the Rays, Banda was 0–0 with a 6.75 ERA.

Banda was designated for assignment on August 30, 2020.

San Francisco Giants
On August 31, 2020, Banda was traded from the Rays to the San Francisco Giants for cash considerations. On November 1, 2020, Banda was outrighted off of the 40-man roster and elected free agency, but quickly re-signed with the Giants on a new minor league contract. Banda was assigned to the Triple-A Sacramento River Cats to begin the 2021 season, but struggled to a 3–2 record and 6.86 ERA in 10 appearances.

New York Mets
On July 2, 2021, Banda was traded to the New York Mets in exchange for Will Toffey. He was assigned to the Triple-A Syracuse Mets. On July 19, Banda was selected to the active roster. In five appearances for the Mets, Banda pitched to a 7.36 ERA with seven strikeouts. On July 31, the Mets designated Banda for assignment.

Pittsburgh Pirates
On August 2, 2021, Banda was claimed off of waivers by the Pittsburgh Pirates. He was later optioned to the Triple-A Indianapolis Indians.

Toronto Blue Jays
On July 2, 2022, Banda was traded to the Toronto Blue Jays for cash considerations.  He was designated for assignment on August 2. He was released on August 6.

Seattle Mariners
On August 9, 2022, Banda signed a minor league contract with the Seattle Mariners.

New York Yankees
Banda opted out of his contract with the Mariners and signed a major league contract with the New York Yankees on August 28, 2022. He was designated for assignment on September 3. On October 24, Banda elected free agency.

Washington Nationals
On January 4, 2023, Banda signed a minor league deal with the Washington Nationals.

Personal life
Banda has a son who was born in December 2018.

References

External links

Living people
1993 births
Sportspeople from Corpus Christi, Texas
Baseball players from Texas
Major League Baseball pitchers
Arizona Diamondbacks players
Tampa Bay Rays players
New York Mets players
Pittsburgh Pirates players
Toronto Blue Jays players
New York Yankees players
San Jacinto North Gators baseball players
Arizona League Brewers players
Helena Brewers players
Wisconsin Timber Rattlers players
South Bend Silver Hawks players
Visalia Rawhide players
Mobile BayBears players
Reno Aces players
Durham Bulls players
Sacramento River Cats players
Syracuse Mets players
Tacoma Rainiers players
Scranton/Wilkes-Barre RailRiders players